David Nue Domgjonas (born 21 May 1997), commonly known as David Domgjoni, is a Kosovan professional footballer who plays as a centre-back for Turkish club Manisa and the Kosovo national team.

Club career

Tirana
On 2 July 2014, Domgjoni signed his first professional contract with Kategoria Superiore side Tirana after agreeing to a five-year deal. Three months later, he made his debut with Tirana in the 2014–15 Albanian Cup first round against Sopoti after being named in the starting line-up.

Loan at Kastrioti
On 22 January 2016, Domgjoni was loaned out to Kategoria e Parë club Kastrioti until the end of the 2015–16 season. On 13 February 2016, he made his debut in a 3–0 home win against Ada after being named in the starting line-up.

Return to Liria as loan
On 24 August 2017, Domgjoni joined as loan to Football Superleague of Kosovo side Liria Prizren. Fourteen days later, the club confirmed that he had joined on a season-long loan. Two days after joining, Domgjoni made his debut in a 1–0 away defeat against Prishtina after being named in the starting line-up.

Return to Kastrioti
On 8 August 2018, Domgjoni signed a one-year contract with Kategoria Superiore club Kastrioti. Ten days later, he made his debut in a 0–1 away win against Luftëtari after coming on as a substitute at 61st minute in place of Juljan Shehu.

Laçi
On 31 January 2019, Domgjoni signed a two-year contract with Kategoria Superiore club Laçi. Seventeen days later, he made his debut in a 1–0 home win against Partizani Tirana after coming on as a substitute at last minutes in place of Regi Lushkja.

Menemenspor
On 31 January 2020, Domgjoni signed a two-and-a-half-year contract with TFF First League club Menemenspor. Ten days later, he made his debut in a 2–2 away draw against Akhisarspor after being named in the starting line-up.

Luzern
On 28 July 2021, Domgjoni signed a two-year contract with Swiss Super League club Luzern. Four days later, he was named as a Luzern substitute for the first time in a league match against St. Gallen. His debut with Luzern came four days later in the 2021–22 UEFA Europa Conference League third qualifying round against Dutch side Feyenoord after coming on as a substitute at 63rd minute in place of Patrick Farkas. Three days after debut, Domgjoni made his league debut in a 1–3 home defeat against Zürich after coming on as a substitute at 55th minute in place of Holger Badstuber.

Termalica
On 2 February 2022, Domgjoni signed a one-year contract with Ekstraklasa club Termalica. His debut with Termalica came two days later in a 2–1 home win against Jagiellonia Białystok after coming on as a substitute at 73rd minute in place of Kacper Śpiewak.

Manisa
On 23 July 2022, Domgjoni signed a two-year contract with TFF First League club Manisa. His debut with Manisa came on 13 August in a 0–1 home defeat against Boluspor after being named in the starting line-up.

International career

Albania

Under-17
In December 2012, Domgjoni received a call-up from Albania U17 for a selection camp in Pristina, Kosovo from 3–4 December 2012. On 23 March 2014, he was named as part of the Albania U17 squad for 2014 UEFA European Under-17 Championship elite round. Three days later, Domgjoni made his debut with Albania U17 in a 2014 UEFA European Under-17 Championship elite round match against Italy U17 after being named in the starting line-up.

Under-19
On 5 March 2015, Domgjoni was named as part of the Albania U19 squad for Roma Caput Mundi. Four days later, he made his debut with Albania U19 in a match against Malta U19 after being named in the starting line-up and scored own goal during a 0–1 home defeat.

Period as unused substitute
Domgjoni after the debuts made with Albania U17 and U19, where he played with these teams in three official matches, came the period as an unused substitute and this happened during the matches that were called by Albania U21 in the friendly match against Italy U21 in August 2016, and by Albania U20 in the unofficial friendly matches against Azerbaijan U21 in January 2018.

Kosovo
On 31 May 2021, Domgjoni received a call-up from Kosovo for the friendly matches against Guinea and Gambia. Eight days later, he made his debut with Kosovo in a friendly match against Guinea after being named in the starting line-up.

Personal life
Domgjoni was born in Prizren, FR Yugoslavia from Kosovo Albanian parents. On 18 February 2014, he obtained Albanian passport.

Career statistics

Club

International

Honours

Club
Tirana
Albanian Cup: 2016–17

References

External links

David Domgjoni at the Albanian Football Association

1997 births
Living people
Sportspeople from Prizren
Kosovan footballers
Kosovo international footballers
Kosovan expatriate footballers
Kosovan expatriate sportspeople in Albania
Kosovan expatriate sportspeople in Turkey
Kosovan expatriate sportspeople in Switzerland
Kosovan expatriate sportspeople in Poland
Albanian footballers
Albania youth international footballers
Albanian expatriate footballers
Albanian expatriate sportspeople in Turkey
Albanian expatriate sportspeople in Switzerland
Albanian expatriate sportspeople in Poland
Association football central defenders
Shkëndija Tiranë players
Kategoria Superiore players
KF Tirana players
KF Laçi players
Kategoria e Parë players
KS Kastrioti players
Football Superleague of Kosovo players
KF Liria players
TFF First League players
Swiss Super League players
FC Luzern players
Expatriate footballers in Poland
Ekstraklasa players
Bruk-Bet Termalica Nieciecza players